The Research School for Socio-Economic and Natural Sciences of the Environment (SENSE Research School) is a joint venture for integrated environmental and sustainability research and multidisciplinary PhD training in the Netherlands. The school was accredited by the Royal Netherlands Academy of Arts and Sciences (KNAW) during 1997-2006, was not accredited during 2007, and in 2007 had applied for reaccreditation by a revamped KNAW successor.  It was reacccredited in 2008 and 2014. In 2007 the program listed 80 Ph.D. courses.

In 2013, there were 600 Ph.D. students affiliated with the program.

Members
It is based on a partnership between (departments of) eleven Dutch academic institutions (nine universities and two institutes):

 Groningen University - Center for Energy and Environmental Studies
 Leiden University - Institute of Environmental Sciences
 Open University Herleen - School of Science
 Netherlands Environmental Assessment Agency
 Radboud University Nijmegen - Department of Environmental Science
 University of Amsterdam - Institute for Biodiversity and Ecosystem Dynamics
 University of Twente - Water Engineering & Management Department and Faculty of Geo-Information Science and Earth Observation
 IHE Delft Institute for Water Education
 Utrecht University - Copernicus Institute for Sustainable Development and Innovation
 VU University Amsterdam - Department of Ecological Science and Institute for Environmental Studies
 Wageningen University - Wageningen Institute for Environment and Climate Research

Climate change
The program was to be subsidized by the Dutch Ministry of Environment during 2007-2009 "for the specific purpose of organizing a process of knowledge exchange, which is dedicated to the determination of the 50 most pressing policy-relevant research questions related to environmental and climate change issues in the coming years."

The program's large number of Ph.D. students was used in an unusual way in 2013.  They were called upon for use in rapid vetting of a draft climatic change report in a crowd-sourcing mode.  The process initially sought participation students pursuing Ph.Ds in the Netherlands, and ended up obtaining 40 of them plus 50 Ph.D. students from elsewhere.  The students were distributed across 30 teams including at least one Dutch student per team, and the Dutch students earned educational credits plus "blooper bonus" pay and other incentives.

References

External links
 
 SENSE Portal, with descriptions of current research clusters and course offerings

Environmental research institutes
Universities in the Netherlands